Nantwich is a market town and civil parish in Cheshire East, Cheshire, England. It contains 132 listed buildings and structures, with three classified as grade I, seven as grade II* and 122 as grade II. In the United Kingdom, the term "listed building" refers to a building or other structure officially designated as being of special architectural, historical or cultural significance. There are three grades: grade I denotes buildings of outstanding architectural or historical interest, grade II* denotes particularly significant buildings of more than local interest, and grade II includes buildings of special architectural or historical interest. Buildings in England are listed by the Secretary of State for Culture, Olympics, Media and Sport on recommendations provided by English Heritage, which also determines the grading. This list includes the listed buildings and structures within the boundaries of the civil parish of Nantwich.

Nantwich lies on the banks of the River Weaver on the Cheshire Plain. The town is believed to have been a salt-producing centre from the 10th century or earlier. A Norman castle was built at the crossing of the Weaver before 1180, probably near where the Crown Inn now stands. Although nothing remains of the castle above ground, it affected the town's layout. During the medieval period, Nantwich was the most important salt town and probably the second most important settlement in the county after Chester. By the 14th century, the town held a weekly cattle market at the end of Beam Street, and was also important for its tanning industry centred on Barker Street. A fire destroyed most of the town to the east of the Weaver in 1583. Elizabeth I personally contributed to the town's rebuilding, which occurred rapidly and followed the plan of the destroyed town. The salt industry peaked in the mid-16th century, with around 400 salt houses in 1530, and had almost died out by the end of the 18th century; the last salt house closed in the mid-19th century. Nikolaus Pevsner considers the decline in the salt industry to have been the critical factor in preserving the town's historic buildings. The town's location on the London to Chester road meant that Nantwich served the needs of travellers from the medieval era. This trade declined in the 19th century, however, with the opening of Telford's road from London to Holyhead, which offered a faster route to Wales, and later when the Grand Junction Railway bypassed the town.

The listed buildings are clustered particularly in the town centre on Barker Street, Beam Street, Churchyard Side, High Street and Hospital Street, and extending across the Weaver on Welsh Row. The oldest listed building is St Mary's Church, which dates from the 14th century and is listed at grade I. Two other listed buildings are known to pre-date the fire of 1583: Sweetbriar Hall and the grade-I-listed Churche's Mansion are both timber-framed, "black and white" Elizabethan mansion houses. A few years after the fire, William Camden described Nantwich as the "best built town in the county", and particularly fine examples of timber-framed buildings constructed during the town's rebuilding include 46 High Street and the grade-I-listed Crown coaching inn. Many half-timbered buildings, such as 140–142 Hospital Street, have been concealed behind brick or render. The town contains many Georgian town houses; good examples include Dysart Buildings, 9 Mill Street, Townwell House and 83 Welsh Row. Several examples of Victorian corporate architecture are listed, including the former District Bank by Alfred Waterhouse. The most recent listed buildings are 1–5 Pillory Street, a curved corner block in 17th-century French style which dates from 1911, and the war memorial which dates from 1921. The majority of the town's listed buildings were originally residential; churches, chapels, public houses, schools, banks, almshouses and workhouses are also well represented. Unusual listed structures include a mounting block, twelve cast-iron bollards, a stone gateway, two garden walls and a summerhouse.

Key

Listed buildings

Notes
Location is given first as a grid reference, based on the British national grid reference system (or OSGB36) of the Ordnance Survey; and second as World Geodetic System 84 coordinates, used by the Global Positioning System. Data derive from grid references at English Heritage's Listed Buildings Online website, except where noted.

Locations for Wright's Almshouses and Nantwich Workhouse at Listed Buildings Online are incorrect; these locations are based on the Ordnance Survey.

References

Sources
Bavington G et al. Nantwich, Worleston & Wybunbury: A Portrait in Old Picture Postcards (Brampton Publications; 1987)
Beck J. Tudor Cheshire. A History of Cheshire, Vol. 7 (Series Editor: JJ Bagley) (Cheshire Community Council; 1969)
Blacklay F. Almshouses of Nantwich (A4 Media Services; 1995)
Crewe & Nantwich Borough Council: Schedule of Buildings of Architectural or Historic Interest
Hall J. A History of the Town and Parish of Nantwich, or Wich Malbank, in the County Palatine of Chester (1883) 
Hewitt HJ. Cheshire under the Three Edwards. A History of Cheshire, Vol. 5 (Series Editor: JJ Bagley) (Cheshire Community Council; 1967)
Lake J. The Great Fire of Nantwich (Shiva Publishing; 1983)
Lamberton A, Gray R. Lost Houses in Nantwich (Landmark Publishing; 2005)
McKenna L. Timber Framed Buildings in Cheshire (Cheshire County Council; 1994)
Nicolle D. Francis Frith's Nantwich and Crewe: Photographic Memories (Frith Book Company; 2004)
Pevsner N, Hubbard E. The Buildings of England: Cheshire (Penguin Books; 1971)
Phillips ADM, Phillips CB (eds). A New Historical Atlas of Cheshire (Cheshire County Council & Cheshire Community Council Publications Trust; 2002)
Simpson RC. Crewe and Nantwich: A Pictorial History (Phillimore; 1991)
Stevenson PJ. Nantwich: A Brief History and Guide (1994)
Whatley A. Nantwich in Old Picture Postcards: 1880–1930 (European Library; 1992)

External links

 Listed buildings in Nantwich, Cheshire

Nantwich
Nantwich
Buildings and structures in Nantwich